Kike Tortosa may refer to:
Kike Tortosa (footballer, born 1983), Spanish footballer
Kike Tortosa (footballer, born 1991), Spanish footballer